Mike Seeger (August 15, 1933August 7, 2009) was an American folk musician and folklorist. He was a distinctive singer and an accomplished musician who played autoharp, banjo, fiddle, dulcimer, guitar, mouth harp, mandolin, dobro, jaw harp, and pan pipes. Seeger, a half-brother of Pete Seeger, produced more than 30 documentary recordings, and performed in more than 40 other recordings. He desired to make known the caretakers of culture that inspired and taught him.

Family and early life
Seeger was born in New York and grew up in Maryland and Washington D.C.  His father, Charles Louis Seeger Jr., was a composer and pioneering ethnomusicologist, investigating both American folk and non-Western music. His mother, Ruth Crawford Seeger, was a composer. His eldest half-brother, Charles Seeger III, was a radio astronomer, and his next older half-brother, John Seeger, taught for years at the Dalton School in Manhattan. His next older half brother was Pete Seeger. His uncle, Alan Seeger, the poet who wrote "I have a rendezvous with Death", was killed during the First World War. Seeger was a self-taught musician who began playing stringed instruments at the age of 18.  He also sang Sacred Harp with British folk singer Ewan MacColl and his son, Calum. Seeger's sister Peggy Seeger, also a well-known folk performer, married MacColl, and his sister Penny wed John Cohen, a member of Mike's musical group, New Lost City Ramblers.

The family moved to Washington D.C. in 1936 after his father's appointment to the music division of the Resettlement Administration. While in Washington D.C., Ruth Seeger worked closely with John and Alan Lomax at the Archive of American Folk Song at the Library of Congress to preserve and teach American folk music. Ruth Seeger's arrangements and interpretations of American Traditional folk songs in the 1930s, 1940s and 1950s are well regarded.

Musical career
At about the age of 20, Mike Seeger began collecting songs by traditional musicians on a tape recorder. Folk musicians such as Lead Belly, Woody Guthrie, John Jacob Niles, and others were frequent guests in the Seeger home.

In 1958 he co-founded the New Lost City Ramblers, an old-time string band in New York City, during the Folk Revival. The other founding members included John Cohen and Tom Paley.  Paley later left the group in 1962 and was replaced by Tracy Schwarz. The New Lost City Ramblers directly influenced countless musicians in subsequent years. The Ramblers distinguished themselves by focusing on the traditional playing styles they heard on old 78rpm records of musicians recorded during the 1920s and 1930s.  Tracy was also in Mike's other band, Strange Creek Singers.  So was Mike's former wife, Alice Gerrard.  She was Alice Seeger in that band and sang and played guitar in it.  The other people in Strange Creek Singers were bass player and singer Hazel Dickens and banjo player Lamar Grier.  Mike sang and played guitar, banjo, fiddle, mandolin, autoharp, and harmonica in the band.

Seeger received six Grammy nominations and was the recipient of four grants from the National Endowment for the Arts, including a 2009 National Heritage Fellowship, which is the United States government's highest honor in the folk and traditional arts. His influence on the folk scene was described by Bob Dylan in his autobiography, Chronicles: Volume One. He was a popular presenter and performer at traditional music gatherings such as Breakin' Up Winter.

Eight days before his 76th birthday, Mike Seeger died at his home in Lexington, Virginia, on August 7, 2009, after stopping cancer treatment.

The Mike Seeger Collection, which includes original sound and video recordings by Mike Seeger, is located in the Southern Folklife Collection of the Wilson Library of the University of North Carolina at Chapel Hill.

Discography
 Old Time Country Music (Smithsonian Folkways) (1962)
 Mike Seeger (Vanguard) (1964) 
 Tipple, Loom & Rail (Smithsonian Folkways) (1965)
 Mike and Peggy Seeger (Argo) (1966)
 Mike and Alice Seeger in Concert (King (JP)) (1971)
 Music From True Vine (Mercury) (1972)
 Berkeley Farms (Folkways) (1972)
 The Second Annual Farewell Reunion (Mercury) (1973)
 American Folk Songs for Children (Rounder) (1977)
 Alice Gerrard and Mike Seeger (Greenhays) (1980)
 Fresh Oldtime String Band Music (Rounder) (1988)
 American Folk Songs for Christmas (Rounder) (1989)
 Solo: Oldtime Country Music (Rounder) (1991)
 Animal Folk Songs for Children (Rounder) (1992)
 Third Annual Farewell Reunion (Rounder) (1994)
 Way Down in North Carolina (w/ Paul Brown) (Rounder) (1996)
 Southern Banjo Sounds (Smithsonian Folkways) (1998)
 Retrograss (w/ John Hartford and David Grisman) (Acoustic Disc) (1999)
 True Vine (Smithsonian Folkways) (2003)
 Early Southern Guitar Sounds (Smithsonian Folkways) (2007)
 Robert Plant and Alison Krauss – Raising Sand (Rounder) (2007)
 Ry Cooder – My Name Is Buddy (Nonesuch) (2007)
 Talking Feet (Book) Compiled with dancer Ruth Pershing (Consignment) (2007)
 Talking Feet (DVD) (Smithsonian Folkways) (2007)
 Bowling Green (w/ Alice Gerrard) (5-String Productions) (2008) (Re-release of Greenhays released in 1980)
 Fly Down Little Bird (Appalseed) (2011)

Recordings with the New Lost City Ramblers

 New Lost City Ramblers (Smithsonian Folkways) (1958)
 Old Timey Songs for Children (Smithsonian Folkways) (1959)
 Songs for the Depression (Smithsonian Folkways) (1959)
 New Lost City Ramblers – Vol. 2 (Smithsonian Folkways) (1960)
 Newport Folk Festival, 1960, Vol. 1 (Vanguard - VRS 9083) (1960)
 New Lost City Ramblers – Vol. 3 (Smithsonian Folkways) (1961)
 New Lost City Ramblers (Smithsonian Folkways) (1961)
 New Lost City Ramblers – Vol. 4 (Smithsonian Folkways) (1962)
 American Moonshine and Prohibition Songs (Smithsonian Folkways) (1962)
 New Lost City Ramblers – Vol. 5 (Smithsonian Folkways) (1963)
 Gone to the Country (Smithsonian Folkways) (1963)
 String Band Instrumentals (Smithsonian Folkways) (1964)
 Rural Delivery No. 1 (Smithsonian Folkways) (1964)
 Modern Times (Smithsonian Folkways) (1968)
 New Lost City Ramblers with Cousin Emmy (Smithsonian Folkways) (1968)
 Remembrance of Things to Come (Smithsonian Folkways) (1973)
 On the Great Divide (Smithsonian Folkways) (1975)
 Earth is Earth (Smithsonian Folkways) (1978)
 Tom Paley, John Cohen, Mike Seeger Sing Songs of the New Lost City Ramblers (Smithsonian Folkways) (1978)
 20th Anniversary Concert, with Elizabeth Cotten, Highwoods String Band, Pete Seeger & the Green Grass Cloggers (FLYING FISH (Rounder)) (1978)
 The Early Years, 1958–1962 (Smithsonian Folkways) (1991)
 Out Standing in their Field: The New Lost City Ramblers, Vol 2, 1963–1973 (Smithsonian Folkways) (1993)
 There Ain't No Way Out (Smithsonian Folkways) (1997)
 40 Years of Concert Recordings (Rounder) (2001)
 50 Years: Where Do You Come From? Where Do You Go? (Smithsonian Folkways) (2008)

Recording with Strange Creek Singers
 Strange Creek Singers (Mike and Alice Seeger, Hazel Dickens, Tracy Schwarz, Lamar Grier) (Arhoolie) (1972)

Selected films featuring Mike Seeger
 Homemade American Music (1980) by Yasha Aginsky
 Always Been a Rambler (2009) by Yasha Aginsky

References

External links
Official site
 
 

1933 births
2009 deaths
American fiddlers
American folk musicians
Deaths from cancer in Virginia
Musicians from New York City
People from Lexington, Virginia
Old-time musicians
Appalachian old-time fiddlers
Seeger family
Jaw harp players
American folk singers
American mandolinists
National Heritage Fellowship winners
20th-century American violinists
20th-century American male singers
20th-century American singers
American autoharp players